General Malcolm may refer to:

George Malcolm (Indian Army officer) (1818–1897), British Indian Army general
George Alexander Malcolm (1810–1888), British Army general
John Malcolm (1769–1833), Madras Army major general
Neill Malcolm (1869–1953), British Army major general